Sergei Dmitrievich Yefimov (born 15 October 1987) is a Russian football coach and a former player. He works as an assistant coach for the Under-19 squad of FC Lokomotiv Moscow. His position was defender.

International career
He was called up to the Russia national football team for a qualifier against Estonia because of a large amount injuries to key defenders but did not play.

External links 
 

1987 births
People from Korolyov, Moscow Oblast
Living people
FC Lokomotiv Moscow players
Russian footballers
Russia under-21 international footballers
Russian Premier League players
FC Khimki players
FC Torpedo Moscow players
Association football defenders
FC Dynamo Bryansk players
Sportspeople from Moscow Oblast